Dąbrówka is a residential neighbourhood, and an area of the Municipal Information System, in the city of Warsaw, Poland, located within the district of Ursynów.

History 
First known mention of the village of Dąbrówka, then listed as Dambrowka, dates to the year 1422. By 1580, it had the status of zaścianek, a village inhabited by the petty nobility of the Kingdom of Poland, and was administratively part of the Warsaw Land, within the Masovian Voivodeship.

On 5 May 1951, the village had been incorporated into the city of Warsaw.

Notes

References 

Neighbourhoods of Ursynów
Neighbourhoods
Warsaw